Gardinerichthys is a genus of actinopterygian bony fish from the Asselian (early Permian) of Germany, and the middle Permian of India. It is now extinct. Gardinerichthys was named after British palaeontologist and zoologist Brian G. Gardiner (1932 - 2021).

See also

 Prehistoric fish
 List of prehistoric bony fish

References

External links
 Bony fish in the online Sepkoski Database

Palaeonisciformes